The Alfvén surface is the boundary separating the sun's corona from the solar wind defined as where the coronal plasma's Alfvén speed and the large-scale solar wind speed are equal. It is named after Hannes Alfvén, and is also called Alfvén critical surface or Alfvén point. Parker Solar Probe became the first spacecraft that crossed Alfvén surface of the Sun.

Definition 
The Sun does not have a solid surface. However, it does have a superheated atmosphere, made of solar material bound to the Sun by gravity and magnetic forces. The Sun's corona extends far beyond the solar surface, or photosphere, and is considered the outer boundary of the Sun. It marks the transition to the solar wind which moves through the Solar System. This limit is defined by the distance at which disturbances in the solar wind cannot propagate back to the solar surface. Those disturbances cannot propagate back towards the Sun if the outbound solar wind speed exceeds Mach one, the speed of 'sound' as defined for the solar wind. This distance forms an irregular 'surface' around the Sun is called the Alfvén surface. It can also be described as a point where gravity and magnetic fields are too weak to contain heat and pressure that push the material away from the Sun. This is the point where solar atmosphere ends and where solar wind begins.

Adhikari, Zank, & Zhao (2019) define the Alfvén surface as:
the location at which the large-scale bulk solar wind speed  and the Alfvén speed  are equal, and thus it separates sub-Aflvénic coronal flow ||≪|| from super-Alfvénic solar wind flow ||≫||

DeForest, Howard, & McComas (2014) define the Alfvén surface as:a natural boundary that marks the causal disconnection of individual packets of plasma and magnetic flux from the Sun itself. The Alfvén surface is the locus where the radial motion of the accelerating solar wind passes the radial Alfvén speed, and therefore any displacement of material cannot carry information back down into the corona. It is thus the natural outer boundary of the solar corona, and the inner boundary of interplanetary space.

Research 
Researchers were unsure exactly where the Alfvén critical surface of the Sun lay. Based on remote images of the corona, estimates had put it somewhere between 10 to 20 solar radii from the surface of the Sun. On April 28, 2021, during its eighth flyby of the Sun, NASA's Parker Solar Probe encountered the specific magnetic and particle conditions at 18.8 solar radii that indicated that it penetrated the Alfvén surface; the probe measured the solar wind plasma environment with its FIELDS and SWEAP instruments. This event was described by NASA as "touching the Sun". During the flyby, Parker Solar Probe passed into and out of the corona several times. This proved the predictions that the Alfvén critical surface isn't shaped like a smooth ball, but has spikes and valleys that wrinkle its surface.

Further reading

References

External links 
 

Sun
Solar phenomena